Reformed Church(es) in South Africa may refer to:

 Dutch Reformed Church in South Africa
 Nederduitse Gereformeerde Kerk, Dutch Reformed Church in South Africa - NG Church
 Nederduitsch Reformed Church in Africa – NH Church
 Gereformeerde Kerke, Reformed Churches (in South Africa)
 Christian Reformed Church in South Africa
 Free Reformed Churches of South Africa
 Uniting Reformed Church in Southern Africa

See also
 Dutch Reformed Church (disambiguation)